Willie Person Mangum (May 10, 1792September 7, 1861) was an American politician and planter who served as U.S. Senator from the state of North Carolina between 1831 and 1836 and between 1840 and 1853. He was one of the founders and leading members of the Whig party, and was a candidate for president in 1836 as part of the unsuccessful Whig strategy to defeat Martin Van Buren by running four candidates with local appeal in different regions of the country.

Most notably, Mangum served as President pro tempore of the Senate for most of John Tyler's presidency, between 1842 and 1845. He was, therefore, first in the presidential line of succession during this time, as Tyler did not have a vice president. (There was no constitutional mechanism for filling an intra-term vice presidential vacancy at the time.) Had Tyler died, resigned or been removed from office at any time during his presidency, Mangum would have become acting president of the United States.

Early life and education
Mangum was born in Durham County, North Carolina (then part of Orange County), to a family from the planter class. He was the son of Catherine (Davis) and William Person Mangum. In his youth, he attended the respected private school in Raleigh run by John Chavis, a free black. They remained friends for years and had a long correspondence. He graduated from the University of North Carolina in 1815.

Career
Mangum began a law practice and entered politics. He was elected to the United States House of Representatives, serving from 1823 to 1826. After an interlude as a superior court judge, he was elected by the legislature as a Democrat to the Senate from North Carolina in 1830.

Mangum's stay in the Democratic Party was short. He opposed President Andrew Jackson on most of the major issues of the day, including the protective tariff, nullification, and the Bank of the United States. In 1834, Mangum openly declared himself to be a "Whig", and two years later, he resigned his Senate seat.

Due to a lack of organizational cohesion in the new Whig Party during the 1836 election, the Whigs put forward four presidential candidates: Daniel Webster in Massachusetts, William Henry Harrison in the remaining Northern and Border States, Hugh White in the middle and lower South, and Mangum in South Carolina. Some optimistic Whigs foresaw the nomination of several candidates resulting in denying a majority of electoral votes to any one candidate and throwing the election into the House of Representatives, much like what occurred in 1824, where Whig representatives could then coalesce around a single candidate.  This possibility, however, did not come to fruition and Democratic candidate Martin Van Buren won the election with an outright majority of electoral votes. The legislature of South Carolina (which chose their electors until 1865) gave Mangum its 11 electoral votes.

After a four-year absence, Mangum served two more terms in the Senate, where he was an important ally of Henry Clay. In 1842, he succeeded Samuel L. Southard as president pro tempore of the Senate, during a vice presidential vacancy. Upon assuming office on May 23, he also became next in succession to the presidency, and remained so until the swearing in of George M. Dallas on March 4, 1845, a period which included President John Tyler's narrow escape from death in the USS Princeton disaster of 1844. In 1852, he refused an offer to be a candidate for vice president on the Whig national ticket; fellow North Carolinian William Alexander Graham was nominated instead.

Realizing that he had little chance of being re-elected as the Whig Party broke up following the 1852 elections, Mangum retired in 1853 at the end of his second term. In 1856 he, like many ex-Whigs, joined the nativist American Party, but a stroke soon afterward ended his political career.

Mangum died at his family estate in Red Mountain, an unincorporated area of Durham County, on September 7, 1861.  He was buried in the family cemetery on his estate.

Marriage and family
Mangum married Charity Alston Cain in 1819. They had five children. Their only son died in July 1861 at the First Battle of Bull Run, a month before his father.

His slave plantation was known as Walnut Hall.  A 1931 biography of John Chavis noted that Mangum had allowed his former teacher to be buried on his land. The gravesite was found in 1988 by the John Chavis Historical Society, and is now marked as the "Old Cemetery" on maps of Hill Forest.

References

External links

Further reading
 Shanks, Henry. The Papers of Willie Person Mangum.  Raleigh, N.C. : North Carolina Department of Archives and History, 1950-1956 (5 vols).
 Garraty, John A. and Mark C. Carnes. American National Biography, vol. 14, "Mangum, Willie Person". New York : Oxford University Press, 1999.
 Schipke, Norman C. Mangum! Man from Red Mountain. North Charleston, South Carolina : CSI Publishing Platform, 2014.

1792 births
1861 deaths
People from Orange County, North Carolina
Democratic-Republican Party members of the United States House of Representatives from North Carolina
Democratic Party United States senators from North Carolina
Jacksonian members of the United States House of Representatives from North Carolina
Jacksonian United States senators from North Carolina
National Republican Party United States senators from North Carolina
Whig Party United States senators from North Carolina
Presidents pro tempore of the United States Senate
Whig Party (United States) presidential nominees
Candidates in the 1836 United States presidential election
North Carolina Know Nothings
North Carolina Whigs
North Carolina state court judges
North Carolina lawyers
University of North Carolina at Chapel Hill alumni
19th-century American judges
American slave owners